Christine Clayburg (born May 26, 1973, in Paso Robles, California) is an American television meteorologist who also has done some acting, directing and screenwriting.

Beginning as a Geology major at Sacramento State University, she became known as the morning meteorologist on the Minneapolis television station WCCO-TV. She has worked as a meteorologist and science reporter for KABC-TV in Los Angeles,  WHDH-TV in Boston, KHQ-TV in Spokane, KPAX-TV in Missoula and KMSP-TV (also in Minneapolis). She has appeared nationally for Fox News and The Weather Channel. In 2003, she was nominated for an Emmy Award in the Best Weather Anchor category.

As an actor, she has appeared in top rated television shows and independent films.  She played the lead role in the 2005 short film Minneapolis which she also co-wrote.

From 2006 to 2012, she had a recurring role as a news reporter on Desperate Housewives. She has appeared in other roles for  The Mindy Project, 90210, The Closer, Hallmark and Lifetime, always as a newscaster.

Christine also flies with the Minnesota Air National Guard as a loadmaster on the C-130 Hercules and has deployed to Afghanistan and Kuwait in support of Operation Enduring Freedom.

References

External links
 

1973 births
21st-century American actresses
Living people
People from Paso Robles, California
People from Hennepin County, Minnesota
Actresses from Minneapolis
American television meteorologists
American television actresses
Screenwriters from California
American film actresses
Actresses from California
Television personalities from California
American women screenwriters
California State University, Sacramento alumni
Minnesota National Guard personnel
Women in the United States Air Force
Women in the Iraq War
Screenwriters from Minnesota